James Gladden Willis (born March 20, 1927) is a former pitcher in Major League Baseball who played during  and  for the Chicago Cubs. Listed at 6' 3", 175 lb., Willis batted left-handed and threw right-handed. He was born in Doyline, Louisiana and attended Northwestern State University of Louisiana.

Over two seasons, Willis posted a 2–2 record with a 3.39 ERA in 27 appearances, including four starts and two complete games, giving up 25 runs on 59 hits and 35 walks while striking out 20.

External links
Baseball Reference
Retrosheet

1927 births
Living people
Alexandria Aces players
Chicago Cubs players
Baseball players from Louisiana
Greenville Majors players
Major League Baseball pitchers
Monroe Sports players
Northwestern State Demons baseball players
Omaha Cardinals players
Shreveport Sports players
Springfield Cubs players
People from Webster Parish, Louisiana